"Use Me" is the third single by Kid Courageous, taken from their debut album Dear Diary. The single was released as The Use Me EP on 31 October 2005, and reached number 24 on the ARIA Singles Chart.

Track listing

Charts

Release history

References

Kid Courageous songs
2005 singles
2005 songs
Universal Music Group singles